Erwin Nestle (22 May 1883 in Münsingen, Germany – 1972), son of Eberhard Nestle, was a German scholar who continued editing his father's "Nestle Edition" of the New Testament in Greek, adding a full critical apparatus in the thirteenth edition.

References

1883 births
1972 deaths
People from Münsingen, Germany